The Entropy Effect is a science fiction novel by American writer Vonda N. McIntyre, set in the fictional Star Trek Universe. It was originally published in 1981 and is the first original story in Pocket Books' long-running series of Star Trek novels (and the second published, after the novelization of Star Trek: The Motion Picture). The novel includes the first occurrence of given names for the characters Hikaru Sulu and Nyota Uhura, each of which were later made canon (in the films Star Trek VI and Star Trek, respectively).

Robert Greenberger, the Editor at Starlog Press with responsibility for the Star Trek franchise, reviewed the novel favorably, calling it "captivating reading" and praising the characterization and the "scientific emphasis".  It was the first novel that was effective in giving prominence to a supporting character – Sulu, in this case.  McIntyre's naming of Sulu as "Hikaru" became canon through the efforts of George Takei and Peter David in the making of the film Star Trek VI: The Undiscovered Country.  The novel was one of the first to explore "beyond the boundaries of the known Trek universe."  McIntyre developed the novel from a screenplay that she had conceived when she was 18, and this "wonderful volume ... convinced Pocket Books to assign the subsequent three movie novelizations" to McIntyre.

Plot summary

The Enterprise is engaged in an unprecedented scientific study of a naked singularity when a top priority message forces Captain Kirk to divert to Aleph Prime, a mining colony in a nearby system. Upon arrival, the high priority of the message seems to have been a mistake: the Enterprise was needed simply to ferry a single criminal to a rehabilitation colony in the same solar system.

The criminal turns out to be a theoretical physicist, Dr. Georges Mordreaux, convicted of murder and unethical research on self-aware beings. Spock thinks Mordreaux could yield insights on the phenomenon he had been researching—namely that for some unknown reason, the increase of entropy has begun to accelerate. This effect would cause precarious ecosystems to collapse and unstable stars to go nova within two decades, and result in the end of the Universe in a few more. But the case against Mordreaux seems very odd, with incomplete evidence, and Spock disbelieves that Mordreaux could be capable of the crime. Prosecutor Braithewaite accompanies them on the journey, convinced that Mordeaux is dangerous. He also has a nagging feeling he has seen Spock before, though Spock is certain they have never met.

While on the planet, Hikaru Sulu meets up with his idol, Captain Hunter, who commands a fighter ship, Aerfen, that had been his first choice for assignment.  Kirk arranges for Sulu to transfer to the Aerfen. In the process Sulu will be forced to leave behind his lover, Security Chief Mandala Flynn.

While en route to the penal colony, odd things continue to happen, such as Scotty seeing Spock appear in two places at the same time. Suddenly, a disheveled Mordreaux appears on the bridge, injures Braithwaite, and shoots Kirk and Flynn with a weapon containing a neurophilic metallo-organic substance, colloquially termed 'spiderweb', that seeks out and strangles nerve fibers, and are thus extremely deadly.

Flynn alerts security before she succumbs, but they insist that Mordreaux never left his quarters, which is quickly confirmed. Kirk is rushed to sickbay where Dr. McCoy struggles to save him, but Kirk dies while Spock is mind-melded to him. The disoriented Braithewaite later sees the two terminate the life support that was maintaining Kirk's brain-dead body, causing him to suspect Spock and McCoy of a conspiracy plot.

Spock determines from questioning Mordreaux that he was imprisoned for developing and using a time travel device. Spock concludes that the older Mordreaux who murdered Kirk was from a different timeline in which Mordreaux became insane and returned to take revenge on those he blamed for his persecution. Since Kirk's death was committed through time travel, Spock constructs a time travel device to go back and try to save Kirk, without success; this results in Scotty's earlier observations. Spock then tries to go even farther back in time to repair the damage to spacetime caused by Mordreaux's earlier time travel; the naked singularity was one of the first physical manifestations of this damage. However, Spock's efforts are complicated by the proliferation of timelines and the difficulty in modifying them. During one of these trips, Spock encounters the younger Braithewaite on Aleph Prime, explaining why the lawyer found him familiar.

Ultimately, it is Mordreaux who convinces himself to halt the research. An even older version of the physicist, from a period where the fabric of reality is breaking down, goes back in time and joins Spock in confronting the younger Mordreaux, at a time just before Mordreaux first uses the device (which act will cause the naked singularity and the acceleration of entropy increase). The strain of so many travels is too much for the oldest Mordreaux's body and he dies. The realization by the younger scientist that he would rather die than face the consequences, leads him to destroy his device and his research. Spock returns to the "present" of the restored timeline to find that all is well, but that he has the memories of both versions of reality. Spock decides not to reveal any of this and informs Kirk that the singularity is in the process of self-destructing. The novel ends with the Enterprise leaving the area, with Sulu about to be granted a field promotion, Kirk having realized that it may be the only way to persuade Sulu not to transfer.

References

External links

Novels based on Star Trek: The Original Series
Novels by Vonda McIntyre
1981 American novels
American science fiction novels